Promothes Mukherjee (born 17 January 1946 in Singhari, Murshidabad district, West Bengal), is a leader of Revolutionary Socialist Party.

He served as member of the Lok Sabha representing Baharampur (Lok Sabha constituency). He was elected to 11th, 12th and 13th Lok Sabha.

References

India MPs 1996–1997
People from Murshidabad district
1946 births
Living people
India MPs 1998–1999
India MPs 1991–1996
Lok Sabha members from West Bengal
Revolutionary Socialist Party (India) politicians